The Ven Richard Harold Guthrie Brand (born Oxted, 20 February 1965) has been Archdeacon of Winchester since 2016.

Brand was  educated at Sherborne, Durham University and Ripon College Cuddesdon. He was ordained deacon in 1989, and priest in 1990. After curacies in King's Lynn and Croydon he was Companion Team Priest at St Barnabas, Christchurch, New Zealand from 1996 to 1998. He was then Priest in charge of  St Peter and St Paul, Hambledon, Hampshire then Team Rector of Harborough until his appointment as Archdeacon.

Notes

1965 births
People from Oxted
People educated at Sherborne School
Alumni of Ripon College Cuddesdon
Archdeacons of Winchester
Living people
Alumni of University College, Durham